Floscaldasia is a genus of South American flowering plants in the family Asteraceae.

 Species
 Floscaldasia azorelloides Sklenář & H.Rob. – Ecuador
 Floscaldasia hypsophila Cuatrec. - Colombia

References

 
Asteraceae genera
Flora of South America
Taxonomy articles created by Polbot